Eberhard Trautner (born 7 February 1967 in Stuttgart) is a retired German footballer who is the currently goalkeeper coach of Belgian Pro League club K.V. Oostende.

Football career
During his career, Trautner played solely for hometown club VfB Stuttgart. However, he only amassed 32 first division appearances during 15 seasons: first he backedup legendary Eike Immel for nine years, then played second-choice to 19-year-old Marc Ziegler in 1995–96, retiring in 2001 after four years in the shadow of Franz Wohlfahrt.

One year after retiring, Trautner began coaching Stuttgart's goalkeepers. In 2011, he was replaced in the post by Andreas Menger. On 6 May 2016, he signed with RB Leipzig to be their goalkeeper coordinator.

Honours
VfB Stuttgart
 Bundesliga: 1991–92
 DFB-Pokal: 1996–97
 DFB-Ligapokal: Runner-up 1997, 1998
 UEFA Cup: Runner-up 1988–89
 UEFA Cup Winners' Cup: Runner-up 1997–98

See also
List of one-club men

References

External links

1967 births
Living people
Footballers from Stuttgart
German footballers
Association football goalkeepers
Bundesliga players
VfB Stuttgart players
VfB Stuttgart II players
VfB Stuttgart non-playing staff
RB Leipzig non-playing staff
Association football coaches
Regionalliga players
West German footballers